Holmes City is an unincorporated community in Douglas County, Minnesota, United States. Holmes City has a post office with ZIP code 56341.

A post office called Holmes City has been in operation since 1868. The community was named for Thomas Andrew Holmes, a pioneer settler.

References

Unincorporated communities in Douglas County, Minnesota
Unincorporated communities in Minnesota